RISD may refer to:
 Rhode Island School of Design
 Rhode Island School for the Deaf
 Rhode Island School of Design Museum or "RISD Museum"
Richardson Independent School District